Ernest Stewart Cox (1900 – 14 September 1992) was a British steam locomotive engineer and author.  He had a career with the Lancashire and Yorkshire Railway, London, Midland and Scottish Railway and British Rail, where he finished as Assistant Chief mechanical engineer.

When British Railways was created at the start of 1948, Cox was appointed to the Railway Executive (RE) in the post of "Executive Officer (Design)", one of several members of staff who reported to R. A. Riddles. As a member of the RE staff, he had an office in the RE headquarters at 222 Marylebone Road, London.

Bibliography
 British Railways standard steam locomotives
 Chronicles of steam
 Locomotive panorama
 Speaking of steam
 World steam in the twentieth century

References

External links
Ernest Stewart Cox at Steamindex

1900 births
1992 deaths
English railway mechanical engineers
Locomotive builders and designers
Lancashire and Yorkshire Railway
London, Midland and Scottish Railway people
British Rail people